Human Biology is a basic biology textbook published in 1993 by Jones & Bartlett Learning. It has been recognized as a "good introductory text" for students without a strong scientific background.

References

External links 
 Human Biology

1993 in biology
1993 non-fiction books
Biology books